Lady from Shanghai is the fourteenth studio album by American band Pere Ubu. It was produced by Pere Ubu's front-man David Thomas and it was released on January 7, 2013, on Fire Records label.

Track listing

Personnel
Pere Ubu
David Thomas − vocals, piano, organ, Xiosynth, Korg iMS-20, Monotron, Roland 303 synthesizers
Keith Moliné − guitar, bass
Robert Wheeler − EML, Grendel Drone Commander, Korg iMS-20, SNM Cacophoner II synthesizers
Gagarin (Graham Dowdall) − piano, organ, digital electronica 
Michele Temple − bass, guitar, bells
Steve Mehlman − drums, organ, vocals
with:
Darryl Boon − clarinet
Technical
Paul Hamann - engineer
Alexandre Horne, John Thompson - front cover

References

Pere Ubu albums
2013 albums
Fire Records (UK) albums